The Stanley Parable is a story-based video game designed and written by developers Davey Wreden and William Pugh. The game carries themes such as choice in video games, the relationship between a game creator and player, and predestination/fate. 

In the game, the player guides a silent protagonist named Stanley alongside narration by British actor Kevan Brighting. As the story progresses, the player is confronted with diverging pathways. The player may contradict the narrator's directions, which if disobeyed will then be incorporated into the story. Depending on the choices made, the player will encounter different endings before the game resets to the beginning. 

The Stanley Parable was originally released on 31 July 2011, as a free modification for Half-Life 2 by Wreden. Together with Pugh, Wreden later released a stand-alone remake using the Source engine under the Galactic Cafe studio name. The remake recreated many of the original mod's choices while adding new areas and story pathways, as well as overhauling the game's graphics entirely. It was announced and approved via Steam Greenlight in 2012, and was released on 17 October 2013, for Microsoft Windows. Later updates to the game added support for macOS on 19 December 2013, and for Linux on 9 September 2015. A further expanded edition titled The Stanley Parable: Ultra Deluxe was released on 27 April 2022. It is available on consoles in addition to previously supported platforms and it includes additional content, as well as further refined graphics.

Both the original mod and its two remakes have received critical praise from journalists. Critics praised the game's narrative and commentary on player choice and decision-making.

Gameplay and synopsis

The Stanley Parable (2013) 
The player has a first-person perspective, and can travel and interact with certain elements of the environment, such as pressing buttons or opening doors, but has no combat or other action-based controls.

The narrator presents the story to the player. He explains that the protagonist Stanley is employee 427 in an office building. Stanley is tasked to monitor data coming from a computer screen and press buttons appropriately without question. One day, the screen monitoring data goes blank, which has never happened before. Stanley, unclear on what to do, begins to explore the building and discovers that the workplace is completely abandoned.

At this stage, the story splits off in numerous possibilities, based on the player's choices. When the player comes to an area where a choice is possible, the player can opt to follow the narrator's directions or perform the opposing action. The initial decision is a set of two open doors. The narrator notes that Stanley traveled through the leftmost door, but this has not yet occurred. The narrator takes the player's choices into account, reacting with new narration or attempts to return the player back to the target path if he is contradicted. For example, if the player were to follow the narrator's directions and pass through the leftmost door, the story of the missing employees proceeds. Alternatively, the player can choose the rightmost door, causing the narrator to adjust his story. In this case, he will urge the player to return to the "proper" path, although the player can continuously disobey the narrator, resulting in other adjustments to the story. In some instances, the narrator breaks the fourth wall when reacting to the player's decisions.

In the original 2011 mod, there were six different endings. Wreden stated it would take about an hour for the player to experience them all. The 2013 remake added more than ten endings, altered some pre-existing endings and the respective routes to trigger them, as well as several Easter eggs, and other choice-related aspects.

The Stanley Parable: Ultra Deluxe (2022) 
Ultra Deluxe expands on the game's endings further, including further routes, new environments, and alternate endings.

Within the Ultra Deluxe content is a series of endings that trigger the next. The player as Stanley discovers a new area of the game proclaiming "new content", but to the narrator's dismay, the content is extremely minimal. On the next reset of the game, the narrator guides Stanley to a new area called the Memory Zone, which recounts all the praise that The Stanley Parable had gotten, but soon find an area full of Steam (referred to as "Pressurized Gas" in the console versions) user reviews that are critical of the game, which leads the narrator to further distress that The Stanley Parable was not good enough. On another reset, the narrator guides Stanley to a showcase of features for The Stanley Parable 2, among which includes collectible figurines to seek in the game, and a "reassurance bucket", which appears in subsequent playthroughs and can be used to alter most initial endings of the game. After further replays of the game, the player revisits the Memory Zone to discover The Stanley Parable 2 has received an extremely negative reception. In all subsequent playthroughs, sequel numbers are added progressively to The Stanley Parable with a randomly generated subtitle, but otherwise no further changes to content.

Development

Half-Life 2 mod 

Davey Wreden, 22 years old at the time of the mod's release, was inspired to create The Stanley Parable about three years prior, after considering the typical storytelling narratives within video games, and thinking of what would happen if the player would go against that narration; he also saw this as a means towards his planned career as a game developer. As a video game player, Wreden found that most major triple-A titles at the time made many assumptions about the player's experience and fitted that within the game, and rarely provided answers for "what if" questions that the player may consider. Wreden believed that recent games with more engaging or thought-provoking stories, including the Metal Gear Solid series, Half-Life 2, Portal, Braid, and BioShock, started to approach this void, giving reason for the player to stop and think about the narration instead of simply going through the motions. Though his initial intent was a personal project simply to try to make such a game that asked the questions about why people play video games, Wreden found that there were other gamers that had been considering the same type of questions. He set out to make a game that would be the subject of discussion for players after they completed it. According to Wreden, his design document for the game was "Mess with the player's head in every way possible, throwing them off-guard, or pretending there's an answer and then kinda whisking it away from in front of them."

With no prior experience working with the Source engine, Wreden relied heavily on information and help from wikis and forums on the Source Development Kit, teaching himself the fundamentals. Outside of Kevan Brighting's voice-over contributions, The Stanley Parable was all Wreden's work. Wreden used an audition process to find a narrator, and found Brighting's submission to be ideal for the game. Brighting had provided his voice in a single pass. Wreden wanted to keep the game short so as to allow players to experience all the endings without spending an excessive amount of time replaying the game. The shortness of the game would also allow him to introduce ridiculous and nonsense endings, such as "and then everything was happy!", that would otherwise insult the player as a poor reward for completing a long game. Most of the ideas he had envisioned for the game were included, though some had to be dropped due to his inability to figure out how to work with them within the Source engine. In one case, Wreden wanted to include a point where the player would have to press buttons as the narration and screen prompts would have said, but could not figure out how to bind keyboard input to do this, but left the element in there as a "broken" puzzle; he later was praised for this, as to players, this gave the impression of lacking control during the stage of narration. Despite the success of completing the game, Wreden considered the overall project "grueling" and stifling his career ambition, noting that his efforts became more intense once he started learning of other players' interest in the title.

Wreden initially tested the game with a friend before posting the mod to the website ModDB, a few weeks prior to his graduation from college. After graduating, Wreden had left for Australia with intent to open a video game-themed bar similar to the Mana Bar, which he had worked at for about a year, but his future plans changed with success of the mod. Wreden had started to receive various offers from others to help work on new games as well as some job offers from larger developers which he turned down, as at the time it was "not the kind of scene" he wanted to work in. Instead, he started to gather other independent programmers to work out an improved version of The Stanley Parable and leading towards a completely new title in the future.

The original mod does not have any original music, but instead makes use of existing soundtracks:

1 "Everything In Its Right Place" - Radiohead (from the album Kid A)
2. "Dead Already" - Thomas Newman (American Beauty soundtrack)
3. "Any Other Name" - Thomas Newman (American Beauty soundtrack)
4. "6 - Ghosts I" - Nine Inch Nails (from the album Ghosts I–IV)
5. "My Way" - performed by Frank Sinatra

2013 remake 

Shortly after the release of the original mod, Wreden was contacted by William Pugh, a player who had experience in creating environments within the Source engine and had previously won a Saxxy Award for his work. Pugh had heard of the mod through word of mouth, and after being impressed with playing it, saw that Wreden was looking for help for improving the mod. The two collaborated each day for two years for the revamped mod. Though initially Wreden wanted to recreate the original game "beat for beat", his discussions with Pugh led to them deciding to alter existing material and add more, an "interpolation" of the original game, and creating a stand-alone title. The remake includes the six endings from the original, as well as updating the game with several newly created endings. Brighting returned to voice the narrator in the remake, as Wreden considered his performance "half the reason this game has been successful". Additionally, a custom soundtrack was created for the remake, composed by Blake Robinson, Yiannis Ioannides, and Christiaan Bakker.

In play-testing the newer version, Pugh found that players did not respond well to having a preconceived idea of where the divergent points in the game took place, as represented by a flowchart early in the game, and this was taken out. However, Pugh also found that without some visual cues as to where divergent paths occurred, they would often miss these choices, and so added elements like colors to highlight that a choice was available at these points. In the original modification, one route travels the player to sections modeled after elements in Half-Life 2. In the remake, Pugh and Wreden included one route where the player is dropped into a Minecraft world, and another where the player briefly revisits the opening of Portal, before being trapped in the original 2011 mod version of The Stanley Parable. These routes were included after getting approval from their creators Markus Persson and Valve, respectively.

To distribute the new version, the team initially considered a pay what you want scheme, but later sought the use of the Steam Greenlight service, where independent developers can solicit votes from other players in order to have Valve subsequently offer the title through Steam. In October 2012, the game was successfully approved by Valve to be included on Steam upon the game's completion. Although Wreden originally called the stand-alone version The Stanley Parable: HD Remix, he later opted to drop the distinguishing title, affirming that he believed the remake is the "definitive" version of the game. The macOS version (requiring 10.8 or later) was later released on December 19, 2013, expanding to support for Linux on September 9, 2015.

In August 2016, Galactic Cafe partnered with IndieBox, a monthly subscription box service, to create an exclusive, custom-designed, physical release of the game. This limited collector's edition included a DRM-free game CD, the official soundtrack, an instruction manual, a Steam key, and various collectibles including an "Adventure Tie" and "Existential Mousepad".

The Stanley Parable Demo 

Wreden and Pugh announced that the remake would be released on Steam on October 17, 2013, and accompanied the announcement with a playable demo. Instead of a traditional demo in which the player is shown a small section of the full game, The Stanley Parable Demo features entirely original content, which was developed to give the player the flavor of the game, using similar concepts of misconceptions and non-linear storytelling that would be present in the final game. The developers found that using a section of the game, taken out of context, left play-testers confused and annoyed with no understanding of that section without including the prior monologues. Wreden stated "the best way to convey what our game is about is through an additional piece of content, completely separate from the main game, that carries the style and tone of the main game without actually spoiling it." This includes a section modeled after a waiting room, which was one of the first elements designed for the demo. According to Wreden, "It catalyzed this sense that even very mundane tasks like sitting in a waiting room are fun if they're not what you're ‘supposed' to be doing".

Personalized versions of the demos were created by Wreden for Game Grumps and Adam Sessler of Revision3 for Let's Play to promote the 2013 remake. These editions included some rerecorded lines directed at these players; Wreden considered that based on the higher-than-average viewership for these videos that this helped towards marketing of the game, and that the demo received similar coverage as the full title. This effectively helped generate media buzz equal to two game titles for the next two months of work it took to create the specialized demo.

Ultra Deluxe 

At The Game Awards 2018, an expanded edition of the game entitled The Stanley Parable: Ultra Deluxe was announced. It was planned for release in 2019 for existing platforms and for consoles. Ultra Deluxe is a joint release by Galactic Cafe and Pugh's Crows Crows Crows. The game was ported to the Unity game engine to support consoles. Additional content was added to this version as well. In November 2019, the studios announced their decision to delay Ultra Deluxe with a mid-2020 release. To generate interest in Ultra Deluxe, the 2013 remake was made available for free for a limited time in March 2020 on the Epic Games Store.

The game was further delayed to 2021 due to the COVID-19 pandemic. In December 2021, the game's publisher Crows Crows Crows announced that the game would be further delayed and would be released in early 2022. Wreden has gone on to state that the script for Ultra Deluxes new content is longer than the script of the entire original game. The game was released on April 27, 2022 for Nintendo Switch, PlayStation 4 and 5, Xbox One, and Xbox Series X/S, in addition to Microsoft Windows, macOS, and Linux through Steam, with owners of the 2013 remake on Steam receiving a discount on Ultra Deluxe for the first two weeks of release. The release date, April 27, is a reference to Stanley's employee number (4/27).

Reception

Half-Life 2 mod 
Within two weeks of its release, the mod was downloaded more than 90,000 times. Responses of most players were positive, and Wreden became "an overnight internet sensation among hardcore gamers."

The Stanley Parable mod was acclaimed by journalists as a thought-provoking game, praising it for being a highly experimental game that only took a short amount of time for the player to experience. Many journalists encouraged players to experience the game themselves, desiring to avoid spoilers that would affect the player's experience, and to offer discussions about the game within their sites' forums. Ben Kuchera of Ars Technica noted that while the game purportedly gives the player choice, many of these end up lacking an effect, as "to feel like you're in more control than you are". Brighting's voice work was considered a strong element, providing the right dry British wit to the complex narration. Alex Aagaard from WhatCulture believes that The Stanley Parable "will be regarded as one of the most pioneering games of all time" during video games' transition from entertainment to a legitimate and respected art form.

The game was listed as an honorable mention for the Seumas McNally Grand Prize and "Excellence in Narrative" award at the 15th Annual Independent Games Festival. The Stanley Parable received the Special Recognition award at IndieCade 2012.

2013 remake 

The 2013 remake has received critical acclaim from reviewers. At Metacritic, as of March 2020, the game holds an 88/100 score based on 47 critic reviews.  Forbes listed Wreden in its 2013 "30 Under 30" leaders in the field of games for the success and marketing of The Stanley Parable. For his work on the game, William Pugh was named as one of 18 "Breakthrough Brits" for 2014 by BAFTA.

Some critics focused on the game's themes of existentialism. Brenna Hillier of VG247 opined how the stand-alone game highlighted the current problems in writing story-driven games, and that "it takes the very limitations of traditional gaming narratives and uses them to ruthlessly expose their own flaws". Ashton Raze of The Telegraph considered that the game "offers ... a look at, not a critique of ... the nature of narrative construction" that can be a factor in other video games. The remake won the Audience Award and was nominated in the categories of "Excellence in Narrative" and "Excellence in Audio" along with being named as a finalist for the Seumas McNally Grand Prize for the 2014 Independent Games Festival Awards. The game was nominated for "Best Story", "Best Debut Game", and "Game Innovation" awards for the 2014 BAFTA Video Games Awards, while Brighting's performance was nominated for the "Performer" award. At the 2013 National Academy of Video Game Trade Reviewers (NAVGTR) awards the game won Writing in a Comedy and Performance in a Comedy, Lead (Kevan Brighting as Narrator).

Wreden reported that more than 100,000 sales were made within the first three days of being available; this was far more revenue than he was expecting, considering that sales from these three days would be enough to allow him to live comfortably and become a full-time developer for the next five years. The game had sold over one million copies in less than a year. The game's demo was received similarly well, and Wreden considered it a key part in the full game's success. IGN's Luke Reilly listed The Stanley Parables demo as one of the top six demos in video games, citing how it is "an entirely standalone exercise designed to prepare [the player] for the unique player and narrator relationship that forms the core of The Stanley Parable experience".

A patch was later released for the game shortly after its release to replace imagery used in a 1950s-style instructional video that some players found racially offensive, with Wreden writing "[W]e always wanted the game to be something that could be played by anyone of any age. If a person would feel less comfortable showing the game to their children then I've got no problem helping fix that!" Following the remake, Wreden began developing his next title, The Beginner's Guide, which was released in October 2015, while Pugh set up the independent studio Crows Crows Crows. Their first game was Dr. Langeskov, The Tiger, and The Terribly Cursed Emerald: A Whirlwind Heist, released in December 2015.

Ultra Deluxe

On the day following the release of The Stanley Parable: Ultra Deluxe, Crows Crows Crows announced on Twitter that the game has sold more than 100,000 copies on Steam within the first 24 hours of being available.

In popular culture 
In May 2014, an announcer pack featuring the voice of the Narrator was released for the multiplayer online battle arena game Dota 2.

The Narrator appears as an optional announcer for Johann Sebastian Joust in the 2014 game compilation Sportsfriends.

The Stanley Parable appeared during episode 7 of the third season of House of Cards—with other games such as Monument Valley appearing throughout the season—where President Frank Underwood is being shown the game by a novelist and video game reviewer who is writing his biography, where the puzzling nature of the game's ability to contradict narrative elements was used as a metaphor for the current politics in the show's fiction.

Severance, an Apple TV+ series, took inspiration from The Stanley Parable.

See also 
 List of video games derived from mods
 The Beginner's Guide – Another video game, also made by Davey Wreden the creator of The Stanley Parable
 Dr. Langeskov, The Tiger, and The Terribly Cursed Emerald: A Whirlwind Heist – a 2015 game reminiscent of The Stanley Parable, created by William Pugh
 Every Day the Same Dream – a 2D art game released in 2009 with similar themes to The Stanley Parable

Notes

References

External links 
 
 The Stanley Parable at Mod DB

2011 video games
Art games
Exploration video games
Fiction about mind control
Fiction with unreliable narrators
First-person adventure games
Impact of the COVID-19 pandemic on the video game industry
Indie video games
Linux games
macOS games
Metafictional video games
Nintendo Switch games
PlayStation 4 games
PlayStation 5 games
Postmodern works
Self-reflexive video games
Source (game engine) mods
Steam Greenlight games
Video games about the paranormal
Video games about video games
Video games developed in the United States
Video games with alternate endings
Video games with commentaries
Windows games
Xbox One games
Xbox Series X and Series S games
Independent Games Festival winners
Single-player video games